Felisberto Cardoso, nicknamed Beto, is a Cape Verdean football coach.

Career
Beto was coach of Sporting Clube da Praia starting in around 2008 for a few years, he would lead his team to win the 2009 Championships and later the 2010 regional championships for the Santiago South Zone, the club that season finished as a finalist in the 2010 edition.

He was appointed interim manager of the Cape Verde national team in February 2014, alongside Men Ramires.

He was later named as acting coach in January 2016, becoming manager permanently in March 2016.

He came back to coach Sporting Praia once more from September 2014 until October 2015. His second management was not as successful as the previous as the club finished second with 34 points for the season behind Boavista FC.

Achievements
As manager:
Cape Verdean Football Championships winner: 2009
Santiago South Zone Football Championships winner: 2009-10

References

Date of birth missing (living people)
Living people
Cape Verdean football managers
Sporting Clube da Praia football managers
Cape Verde national football team managers
Year of birth missing (living people)